Fred D. Shanks (born December 26, 1977) is an American politician serving as a member of the Mississippi House of Representatives from the 60th district. He assumed office on March 19, 2018.

Early life and education 
Shanks was born in Flowood, Mississippi and graduated from University Christian School (now Hartfield Academy). He also attended Hinds Community College and Mississippi State University.

Career 
Shanks previously worked at Brandon Discount Drugs. He later served as a reserve police officer for Brandon, Mississippi and as a member of the Brandon Board of Aldermen. He was elected to the Mississippi House of Representatives in March 2018. He serves as chair of the House Constitution Committee.

References 

Living people
1977 births
People from Flowood, Mississippi
Republican Party members of the Mississippi House of Representatives
People from Brandon, Mississippi